In meteorology, a virga, also called a dry storm, is an observable streak or shaft of precipitation falling from a cloud that evaporates or sublimates before reaching the ground. A shaft of precipitation that does not evaporate before reaching the ground is a precipitation shaft. At high altitudes the precipitation falls mainly as ice crystals before melting and finally evaporating; this is often due to compressional heating, because the air pressure increases closer to the ground.  It is very common in deserts and temperate climates. In North America, it is commonly seen in the Western United States and the Canadian Prairies. It is also very common in the Middle East, Australia, and North Africa.

Virgae can cause varying weather effects, because as rain is changed from liquid to vapor form, it removes significant amounts of heat from the air due to water's high  heat of vaporization. Precipitation falling into these cooling downdrafts may eventually reach the ground.  In some instances these pockets of colder air can descend rapidly, creating a wet or dry microburst which can be extremely hazardous to aviation.  Conversely, precipitation evaporating at high altitude can compressionally heat as it falls, and result in a gusty downburst which may substantially and rapidly warm the surface temperature. This fairly rare phenomenon, a heat burst, also tends to be of exceedingly dry air.

Virgae also have a role in seeding storm cells. This is because small particles from one cloud are blown into neighboring supersaturated air and act as nucleation particles for the next thunderhead cloud to begin forming.

Etymology
The word is derived from the Latin virga 'rod, sprig, staff, branch, shoot, twig, spray, sprout, switch, graft'.

Extraterrestrial occurrences
Sulfuric acid rain in the atmosphere of Venus evaporates before reaching the ground due to the high heat near the surface. Similarly, virgae happen on gas giant planets such as Jupiter. In September 2008, NASA's Phoenix lander discovered a snow variety of virga falling from Martian clouds.

See also 
 Fallstreak hole
 Precipitation shaft
 Sun pillar

References

External links 

  National Science Digital Library - Virga
  "Viewing the Vagaries and Verities of Virga" Alistair B. Fraser and Craig F. Bohren, Department of Meteorology, The Pennsylvania State University, University Park, Pennsylvania, 2 November 1992 and 25 January 1993.

Precipitation